The 2021–22 Melbourne Renegades Women's season was the seventh in the team's history. Coached by Simon Helmot and captained by Sophie Molineux, the Renegades were not scheduled to play any WBBL07 games in their home state of Victoria due to ongoing border restrictions related to the COVID-19 pandemic. They nevertheless finished the regular season in second position—their best performance across the WBBL's first seven editions—catapulted by a standout campaign from Indian marquee Harmanpreet Kaur, who was named Player of the Tournament.

In the Challenger, played at Adelaide Oval on 25 November 2021 for a spot in the championship final, the Renegades suffered a nine-wicket defeat against the Adelaide Strikers and were eliminated from the tournament.

Squad 
Each 2021–22 squad is made up of 15 active players. Teams could sign up to five 'marquee players', with a maximum of three of those from overseas. Marquees are classed as any overseas player, or a local player who holds a Cricket Australia national contract at the start of the WBBL|07 signing period.

Personnel changes made ahead of the season included:

 New Zealand marquees Amy Satterthwaite and Lea Tahuhu did not re-sign with the Renegades, opting to sit out the tournament.
 South African marquee Lizelle Lee departed the Renegades, initially signing with the Hobart Hurricanes.
 English marquee Evelyn Jones and Indian marquee Jemimah Rodrigues signed with the Renegades, marking their first appearances in the league.
 Indian marquee Harmanpreet Kaur returned to the league and signed with the Renegades, having previously played for the Sydney Thunder.
 Molly Strano departed the Renegades, signing with the Hobart Hurricanes.
 Holly Ferling signed with the Renegades, departing the Melbourne Stars.
 Maitlan Brown departed the Renegades, signing with the Sydney Sixers.
 Ellie Falconer signed with the Renegades, departing the Adelaide Strikers.
 Rhiann O'Donnell returned to the Renegades, having been a member of the team in WBBL|03 before playing for the Hobart Hurricanes in WBBL|04.
 Sophie Molineux was appointed captain, replacing Amy Satterthwaite (17–23 win–loss record).
 Simon Helmot was appointed head coach, replacing Lachlan Stevens.

Squad details during the season included:
 Georgia Wareham sustained a left knee injury while fielding in a match on 20 October, ruling her out for the remainder of the season.

The table below lists the Renegades players and their key stats (including runs scored, batting strike rate, wickets taken, economy rate, catches and stumpings) for the season.

Ladder

Fixtures 

All times are local

Regular season

Challenger

Statistics and awards 

 Most runs: Harmanpreet Kaur – 406 (8th in the league)
Highest score in an innings: Harmanpreet Kaur – 81* (55) vs Sydney Thunder, 17 November 2021
Most wickets: Harmanpreet Kaur – 15 (equal 9th in the league)
Best bowling figures in an innings: Ellie Falconer – 4/29 (4 overs) vs Brisbane Heat, 6 November 2021
Most catches (fielder): Harmanpreet Kaur – 8 (equal 5th in the league)
Player of the Match awards:
Harmanpreet Kaur – 3
Jess Duffin, Sophie Molineux, Jemimah Rodrigues, Georgia Wareham – 1 each
WBBL|07 Player of the Tournament: Harmanpreet Kaur (1st)
WBBL|07 Team of the Tournament: Harmanpreet Kaur, Simon Helmot (coach)
Renegades Player of the Season: Harmanpreet Kaur

References 

2021–22 Women's Big Bash League season by team
Melbourne Renegades (WBBL)